"Every Season" is a song by American rapper Roddy Ricch. The song was released on October 28, 2018, as the second single from Ricch's second mixtape Feed Tha Streets II. The song is produced by Cassius Jay and Beezo.

Music video
The official music video of the song was released on October 28, 2018, through Roddy Ricch's YouTube account. The music video was directed by JDFilms. It has accumulated over 130 million views as of October 2020.

Personnel
Credits adapted from Tidal.

 Dave Kutch – masterer
 Kevin Spencer – mixer

Charts

Certifications

References

2018 singles
2018 songs
Roddy Ricch songs
Songs written by Roddy Ricch